Peter Costa (born 5 August 1984) is an Indian professional footballer who plays as a defender for Mumbai City FC in the Indian Super League.

Career

Early career
Costa started his career with Salgaocar before joining fellow I-League side Mumbai for two seasons.

Mumbai City
In 2014, Costa was signed by Mumbai City FC for the inaugural season of the Indian Super League. He made his debut for Mumbai City during the first ever Indian Super League game ever against Atlético de Kolkata at the Salt Lake Stadium where Mumbai City were defeated 3–0.

References

External links 
 Indian Super League Profile.

1984 births
Living people
Indian footballers
Salgaocar FC players
Mumbai FC players
Mumbai City FC players
Association football defenders
I-League players
Indian Super League players
Footballers from Goa